Xala (Wolof for "temporary sexual impotence") is a 1975 Senegalese film directed by Ousmane Sembène. It is an adaptation of Sembène's 1973 novel of the same name.  The film depicts El Hadji, a businessman in Senegal, who is cursed with crippling erectile dysfunction upon the day of his marriage to his third wife. The film satirizes the corruption in African post-independence governments; El Hadji's impotence symbolizes the failure of such governments to be useful at all.

Plot

El Hadji Abdoukader Beye, a Senegalese businessman and a Muslim, takes on a third wife, thereby demonstrating his social and economic success. On the wedding night he discovers that he is incapable of consummating the marriage; he has become impotent. At the beginning, he suspects that one or both of his first two wives have put the spell on him, without realizing that he walks by the true guilty party every day (beggars and people he has stolen from). Much of his journey leads to many efforts to remove the spell, only to not notice that his business empire is falling around him. The film criticizes the African leaders' attitude after Independence, underlining their greed and their inability to step away from foreign influences. In the end, after losing nearly everything, the people he has robbed confront him, and offer to remove the spell—for a price.

Characters 
 El Hadji Abdoukader Beye, a Senegalese businessman
 Rama, Beye's daughter with his first wife
 Adja Awa Astou, Beye's first wife
 Oumi Ndoye, the second wife
 Ngoné, the third wife
 Modu, El Hadji's chauffeur
 Sérigne Mada, a marabout
 The president of the chamber of commerce
 Dupont-Durand, the president's chaperone

Release

Xala received a home video release in 2005. The DVD has been out of print for some time.

Reception

Critical reception

Criticism 

Scholar Aaron Mushengyezi writes: "I posit that in Xala, he evokes two problematic binary oppositions: between the corruption and decadence of foreign influence and the purity and morality of African tradition, the former represented as 'corrupting' and the latter 'redemptive'; and between strong, revolutionary 'masculine' women and villainous, weak, 'feminine' men."

Another scholarly perspective is from Harriet D. Lyons: "I shall argue that in Sembene's work the "covertness" of the folk material takes the form of suppression of detail combined with the retention of essential values. Sembene is thereby able to use folk elements in such a way as to give the work political implications that go well beyond the preservation and/or revival of a local tradition. One can, therefore, examine the folk elements of Xala without fear of consigning yet another expression of African creativity to the museum of primitive art."

Awards
The film was entered into the 9th Moscow International Film Festival.

Festival Internacional de Cine de Karlovy Vary 1976

The film ranked #83 in Empire magazine's "The 100 Best Films of World Cinema" in 2010.

See also
 Cinema of Senegal

References

External links

1975 films
1970s sex comedy films
Senegalese comedy films
1970s French-language films
Wolof-language films
Films based on Senegalese novels
Films directed by Ousmane Sembène
Films about the Serer people
Films set in Senegal
1975 comedy films